Cochlespira leeana is a species of sea snail, a marine gastropod mollusk in the family Cochlespiridae.

Description
The length of the shell attains 24 mm.

Distribution
This marine species occurs off Barbados and Colombia.

References

 Garcia E.F. (2010) Description of four new species of Cochlespira (Gastropoda: Turridae) from the New World. Novapex, 11(4): 107–113

External links

leeana
Gastropods described in 2010